FK Trgovački is a Serbian football club based in Sremska Mitrovica, Serbia.

History

Current team

External links
 https://web.archive.org/web/20090309111046/http://www.fk-trgovacki.com/

Trgovacki Pozarevac
1950 establishments in Serbia
Association football clubs established in 1950